Aggressor is the thirteenth studio album by Hungarian heavy metal band Ektomorf, released on 30 October 2015.

Track listing 
All Music and Lyrics by Zoltán Farkas:
"Intro" - 0:45
"I" - 3:49
"Aggressor" - 2:35
"Holocaust" - 3:56
"Move On" - 3:04
"Evil by Nature" (feat. George "Corpsegrinder" Fisher) - 4:22
"You Can't Get More" - 3:21
"Emotionless World" - 3:26
"Eastside" - 4:16
"Scars" - 3:42
"Damned Nation" - 2:38
"You Lost" - 2:56
"You're Not For Me" - 4:50
"Memento" - 3:03

Personnel
Ektomorf
Zoltán Farkas – vocals, guitar
Tamás Schrottner – guitar
Szabolcs Murvai – bass
Robert Jaksa – drums

Additional musicians
George "Corpsegrinder" Fisher – guest vocals on "Evil by Nature"

References

2015 albums
Ektomorf albums
AFM Records albums